Schandelah is a railway station located in Schandelah, Germany. The station is located on the Brunswick–Magdeburg railway. The train services are operated by Deutsche Bahn.

Train services
The following services currently call at the station:

Local services  Braunschweig - Helmstedt - Magdeburg - Burg

External links

References

Railway stations in Lower Saxony
Buildings and structures in Wolfenbüttel (district)